Ines Fančović (5 October 1925 – 21 August 2011) was a Bosnian actress of film, television and theater. She is best known for her role as Mare in the television series Velo misto and as Mara in Memoari porodice Milić.

Early life
Born as Ines Nikolić in Šibenik, Croatia and grew up in Split.

Career
She started her career in Split. Her best known role was as Mara in the television series Velo misto.

Fančović had roles in films such as The Perfect Circle, Welcome to Sarajevo (both 1997) and Cirkus Columbia (2010), among others.

Personal life
She married Velo misto writer Miljenko Smoje and together they had a daughter, Nataša. Fančović was widowed in 1995.

Fančović moved to the Bosnian capital city Sarajevo in 1960 and remained there until her death. She was in the city throughout the entire Bosnian War and survived the Siege of Sarajevo.

She died at the age of 85 in August 2011 and was buried in the Bare Cemetery in Sarajevo.

Filmography

Films

Quo vadis Živorade (1968)
Crows (1969)
Deveto čudo na istoku (1972)
Pjegava djevojka (1973)
Ljubav i bijes (1978)
Lost Homeland (1980)
Defiant Delta (1980)
Dvije polovine srca (1982)
Kuduz (1989)
Last Waltz in Sarajevo (1990)
Bračna putovanja (1991)
Magareće godine (1994)
Welcome to Sarajevo (1997)
The Perfect Circle (1997)
Cirkus Columbia (2010)

Television

Rođendan (1973)
Odbornici (1975)
Prijatelji (1975)
Tale (1979)
Jegulje putuju u Sargaško more (1979)
Krojač za žene (1980)
Velo misto (1980–81)
Obična priča (1989)
Čovjek koji je znao gdje je sjever a gdje jug (1989)
Memoari porodice Milić (1990)
Foliranti (2011–12)

References

External links

1925 births
2011 deaths
People from Šibenik
Yugoslav actresses
20th-century Bosnia and Herzegovina actresses
Croats of Bosnia and Herzegovina
21st-century Bosnia and Herzegovina actresses
Bosnia and Herzegovina film actresses
Bosnia and Herzegovina stage actresses
Bosnia and Herzegovina television actresses
Burials at Bare Cemetery, Sarajevo